Carmel Stewart (born 1957) is an Irish lawyer who has been a Judge of the High Court since 2014. She was previously a barrister and a Judge of the Circuit Court between 2012 and 2014.

Early life 
Stewart was born in 1957 in Tuam, County Galway and attended the Presentation Convent in Tuam. She finished her Leaving Certificate in 1975 and began studying law at University College Dublin. She decided to leave UCD and worked until she began studying in University College Galway in 1980. She graduated with BA and LLB degrees. She undertook studies to become a barrister at the King's Inns.

Legal career 
She was called to the Bar in 1987 and became a senior counsel in 2008. She devilled with Catherine McGuinness in her first year as a barrister. She specialised in constitutional and public law, including family law, adoption and wards of court.

She appeared in several cases involving abortion in the Republic of Ireland. She acted for the Irish Family Planning Association in an action against Youth Defence. She represented the applicants in A, B and C v Ireland in the European Court of Human Rights in 2009.

She acted as Vice Chairperson of the Employment Appeals Tribunal and was a member of the Mountjoy Prison Visiting Committee between 1996 and 1999. She was a board member of the National College of Art and Design

She was a board member and director of the Free Legal Advice Centres and a chairperson of the Family Lawyers Association. She was a member of the Labour Party and a member of the party executive.

Judicial career

Circuit Court 
Stewart became a Judge of the Circuit Court in April 2012. She was assigned to the Dublin circuit. She presided over cases involving criminal law and family law.

High Court 
In October 2014, she was elevated to the High Court. She frequently hears trials at the Central Criminal Court involving serious criminal offences, including rape and murder. She also hears cases involving vulnerable people, deportation, injunctions, and the Criminal Assets Bureau.

She has presided over cases involving ISIL and the Hutch–Kinahan feud. In October 2018, she discharged a jury after a ten-day trial after barrister Paul Anthony McDermott had explained the defence of provocation in the context of an unrelated trial on an edition of RTÉ's Prime Time.

She was appointed a part-time commissioner of the Law Reform Commission in September 2015. She was appointed for a five-year term to replace Marie Baker.

Personal life 
She is married to Noel Grehan.

References

Living people
High Court judges (Ireland)
Circuit Court (Ireland) judges
Alumni of the University of Galway
Irish women judges
Alumni of King's Inns
21st-century Irish judges
People from Tuam
1957 births
21st-century women judges